Doctor in Clover is a 1960 comedy novel by the British writer Richard Gordon. It is part of Gordon's long-running Doctor series of books.

Adaptation
In 1966 it served as a loose basis for the film of the same title directed by Ralph Thomas and starring Leslie Phillips and James Robertson Justice.

References

Bibliography
 Goble, Alan. The Complete Index to Literary Sources in Film. Walter de Gruyter, 1999.
 Pringle, David. Imaginary People: A Who's who of Fictional Characters from the Eighteenth Century to the Present Day. Scolar Press, 1996.

1960 British novels
Novels by Richard Gordon
Comedy novels
British novels adapted into films
Michael Joseph books
Medical novels